is a passenger railway station in the city of Ichikawa, Chiba, Japan, operated by East Japan Railway Company (JR East).

Lines
It is located 65.9 kilometers from Fuchūhommachi Station.

Station layout
The station consists of two elevated opposed side platforms serving two tracks, with an additional centre track used by freight services. The station building is located underneath the platforms.

Platforms

History
The station opened on 2 October 1978.

Passenger statistics
In fiscal 2019, the station was used by an average of 11,803 passengers daily (boarding passengers only).

Surrounding area
 Ichikawa City Zoo
 Manyō Botanical Gardens
 Higashi Matsudo Hospital

See also
 List of railway stations in Japan

References

External links

 JR East station information 

Railway stations in Japan opened in 1978
Stations of East Japan Railway Company
Railway stations in Chiba Prefecture
Musashino Line
Ichikawa, Chiba